Harold Frederick Switzer (January 16, 1925 – April 14, 1967) was an American child actor, most notable for appearing in the Our Gang short subjects series as an extra. He was the older brother of gang member Carl "Alfalfa" Switzer, one of the series' most popular and best-remembered characters.

Early life and family

Switzer was born in Paris, Illinois, the first son of  George Frederick and Gladys C. Shanks Switzer. He and younger brother, Carl, became famous around their hometown for their musical talent and performances; both sang and played a number of instruments.

Our Gang
The Switzers took a trip to California in 1934 to visit with family members. While sightseeing they eventually wound up at Hal Roach Studios. Following a public tour of the facility, 8-year-old Harold and 6-year-old Carl entered into the Hal Roach Studio's public cafeteria, the Our Gang Café, and began an impromptu performance. Producer Hal Roach was present at the commissary that day and was impressed by the performance. He signed both Switzers to appear in Our Gang.  Harold was given two nicknames, "Slim" and "Deadpan," and Carl was dubbed "Alfalfa."

The Switzer brothers first appeared in the 1935 Our Gang short, Beginner's Luck. Harold played the mandolin, while both brothers sang She'll Be Comin' 'Round The Mountain. By the end of the year, Carl was one of the main characters in the series, while Harold had more or less been relegated to the role of a background player. Both Carl and Harold outgrew the series by 1940, with Slim's last appearance in The New Pupil.

Adult years and death
Harold Switzer did not pursue an on-screen career after leaving the Our Gang series, and his Our Gang appearances would remain his only film credits.

Though not saddled with the same problems his younger brother was faced with due to being typecast as a "child star," Harold had his own problems. For several years, he operated a  Speed Queen Company franchise, installing and servicing washers and dryers. In 1967, after killing a customer over a dispute, Switzer drove himself to a remote area near Glendale, California and killed himself. He was 42.

Harold "Slim" Switzer is interred at the Hollywood Forever Cemetery in Hollywood, California, next to his father, George Frederick Switzer. Carl is on the other side of their father.

Personal life
Switzer was married to Beverly Osso for six years. They had three children: Judith Ann, Tony Frederick and Teddy Berton. Switzer also fathered a child, Gladys, with Rose Lavon.

Filmography 
Beginner's Luck
Teacher's Beau
Sprucin' Up
The Lucky Corner
Our Gang Follies Of 1936
Divot Diggers
The Pinch Singer
Second Childhood
Arbor Day
Bored Of Education
Two Too Young
Pay As You Exit
General Spanky
Glove Taps
Rushin' Ballet
Fishy Tales
Framing Youth
The Pigskin Palooka
Mail And Female
Our Gang Follies Of 1938
Three Men In A Tub
Came The Brawn
The Little Ranger
Party Fever
Aladdin's Lantern
Clown Princes
Cousin Wilbur
Time Out For Lessons
The Big Premiere
The New Pupil

References

External links

American male child actors
American male film actors
American people of German descent
Burials at Hollywood Forever Cemetery
People from Paris, Illinois
Male actors from Illinois
American child singers
1925 births
20th-century American male actors
Suicides in California
20th-century American singers
Our Gang
1967 suicides